Variations on a Theme is the second studio album by experimental singer-songwriter David Thomas, released in May 1983 by Rough Trade Records. Like its predecessor The Sound of the Sand, Variations on a Theme features prominent guitar work from Richard Thompson. In 1997, the album was remastered by Paul Hamann and David Thomas for its inclusion in the Monster anthology box set. It was the only album in the set to be remixed, and its running order was changed.

Track listing

Personnel
Adapted from the Variations on a Theme liner notes.

The Pedestrians
 Anton Fier – drums
 Paul Hamann – bass guitar, engineering
 Jim Jones – guitar
 Jack Monck – guitar
 David Thomas – lead vocals
 Richard Thompson – guitar

Additional musicians
 Lindsay Cooper – bassoon (A5, B3, B4)
 Chris Cutler – drums (A5, B3, B4)
Production and additional personnel
 Ken Hamann – engineering
 Adam Kidron – engineering (A5, B3, B4)
 Mary Thomas – cover art, illustrations
 Robert Vogel – engineering

Release history

References

External links 
 

David Thomas (musician) albums
Richard Thompson (musician) albums
1983 albums
Rough Trade Records albums